Teresa Nowak, née Gierczak (born 29 April 1942) is a Polish hurdler. She competed in the women's 100 metres hurdles at the 1972 Summer Olympics.

References

External links
 

1942 births
Living people
Athletes (track and field) at the 1972 Summer Olympics
Polish female hurdlers
Olympic athletes of Poland
People from Piotrków Trybunalski